Labdia fasciella is a moth in the family Cosmopterigidae. It was described by Sinev in 1993. It is known from the Russian Far East.

References

Natural History Museum Lepidoptera generic names catalog

Labdia
Moths described in 1993